Colin Walter Braid (23 November 1913 – 15 June 1938) was an Australian rules footballer who played with Essendon in the Victorian Football League (VFL). Braid died aged 24, from head injuries sustained when he fell while working in a Broken Hill mine.

Notes

External links 
		

1913 births
1938 deaths
Australian rules footballers from New South Wales
Essendon Football Club players
South Broken Hill Football Club players
Accidental deaths in New South Wales
Industrial accident deaths
Accidental deaths from falls